Roger Searle Penske (born February 20, 1937) is an American businessman and entrepreneur involved in professional auto racing and a retired professional auto racing driver. He is well-known through his ownership of Team Penske, DJR Team Penske, the Penske Corporation, the Indianapolis Motor Speedway, IndyCar, and other automotive-related businesses.

Early life and education
Penske was born in Shaker Heights, Ohio, in 1937. His father, Jay, was a successful corporate executive for a metal fabrication company and encouraged his son to become an entrepreneur. As a teenager he bought older cars, repaired them and sold them at a profit from his family's home in Cleveland, Ohio. He graduated from Shaker Heights High School in 1955 and is a 1959 graduate of Lehigh University, where he was a member of Phi Gamma Delta.

Racing career
Penske's first racing venture was in hillclimbing, but then ran road course racing in Porsches. Penske made his first professional racing start at the now-abandoned Marlboro Motor Raceway in Upper Marlboro, Maryland.

Sports Illustrated named him Sports Car Club of America Driver of the Year in 1961. He competed in two Formula One Grands Prix and won a NASCAR Pacific Coast Late Model race at Riverside in 1963. He never ran the Indianapolis 500: he was offered a rookie test at Indianapolis with the Dean Van Lines team, but turned it down. Rookie Mario Andretti stepped in for Penske to take that test.

Penske continued racing until 1965, when he retired as a driver, to concentrate on his first Chevrolet dealership in Philadelphia, Pennsylvania.

He developed one of the most successful teams in IndyCar Series and NASCAR racing. He is the most successful owner of the Indianapolis 500 with 18 victories. He is known by his nickname of "The Captain". Penske also served as a race strategist for his IndyCar team, most recently for driver Will Power.

Racing teams

Penske Racing debuted in 1966 at the 24 Hours of Daytona, after Penske had retired from race driving. His team first competed in the Indianapolis 500 in 1969, winning that event in 1972 with driver Mark Donohue, and their first NASCAR win was in 1973. His teams have won many races in the subsequent years. He closed his European-based Formula One business in 1977.

Penske Racing now operates an IndyCar Series team composed of Josef Newgarden, Scott McLaughlin, and Will Power, and a NASCAR team with drivers Austin Cindric, Joey Logano, and Ryan Blaney. Previously, Penske Racing ran cars in the CART series that included some of the best drivers of the time, including Gary Bettenhausen, Tom Sneva, Mario Andretti, Bobby Unser, Al Unser, Al Unser Jr., Emerson Fittipaldi, Rick Mears, Danny Sullivan, Paul Tracy, Helio Castroneves and Gil de Ferran. After many years of trying, his team won the Daytona 500 in 2008 with Ryan Newman driving. Penske would later win another Daytona 500 in 2015 with Logano behind the wheel.

In 2005, Porsche set the stage to make a comeback in sports car racing in the United States and chose Penske Racing to run in the LMP2 class of the American Le Mans Series (ALMS). The Penske Porsches took center stage in 2006, winning immediately, including victories at Mid-Ohio finishing 1-2 ahead of Audi (competing in a higher classification) and the annual Petit Le Mans, a 10-hour showcase event held at Road Atlanta. His team scored an overall victory in the 12 Hours of Sebring in 2008.

Penske also ran a Pontiac Riley Daytona Prototype in the 2008 Rolex 24 at Daytona, with Kurt Busch, Ryan Briscoe, and Hélio Castroneves driving. The car was run in conjunction with Wayne Taylor's SunTrust Racing. They finished third overall.

In 2009, Penske suspended his participation in the ALMS, switching to ALMS's rival Grand-Am Rolex Sports Car Series for the full season. They used a Porsche-powered Riley with Timo Bernhard and Romain Dumas driving.

Penske purchased the old Matsushita air conditioning plant in Mooresville, NC, and reconditioned it to consolidate his racing business.

Penske won his first NASCAR Sprint Cup Championship with driver Brad Keselowski on November 18, 2012.

In late 2014, it was announced Penske would take a 51% stake in the Australian V8 Supercars team Dick Johnson Racing, forming DJR Team Penske. The team entered one car in 2015, initially for Marcos Ambrose before he stepped aside to make way for Scott Pye. The team expanded to a second car for New Zealander Fabian Coulthard in 2016, before Pye was replaced with another Kiwi in Scott McLaughlin in 2017. Coulthard won the combined team's first championship race at the 2017 Tyrepower Tasmania SuperSprint. In 2019 the team won the biggest race of the year, the Bathurst 1000.

On September 16, 2018, driver Brad Keselowski won the South Point 400 at Las Vegas Motor Speedway, giving Penske his 500th race victory as an owner across all racing series. Later the same season, Joey Logano would clinch the championship at Homestead-Miami Speedway, winning Penske his 2nd Championship in the Cup series.

In 2019, Penske purchased the Indianapolis Motor Speedway and NTT IndyCar Series from Hulman & Company for an undisclosed sum.

Penske is a corporate director at General Electric and was chairman of Super Bowl XL in Detroit, Michigan. He was previously on the board of The Home Depot and Delphi Automotive before resigning to chair the Detroit Super Bowl Committee.

Personal life
Penske has five children, two with his first wife Lissa, and three with his second wife Kathy: Roger Jr, Gregory, Blair, Mark, and Jay Penske.

An avid car collector, he owns many rare American and European automobiles, including a Ferrari FXX, of which only 30 were made.

Penske's estimated net worth is $3.2 billion as of 2023.

Political activities

Penske Racing donated $500,000 to Restore Our Future, Mitt Romney's Super PAC. He was discussed as a potential candidate for Mayor of Detroit, but he declined to run. Penske endorsed Donald Trump in the 2020 United States presidential election after receiving the Presidential Medal of Freedom in 2019.

Penske Corporation
Penske is chairman of Penske Corporation, based in Bloomfield Hills, Michigan. Some of the company's holdings include a significant stake in publicly-traded Penske Automotive Group, an international company that operates automobile dealerships in the United States, Canada, and parts of Europe; Penske Truck Leasing, a truck sales, leasing, and fleet maintenance company; Penske Motor Group which operates auto dealerships in California and Texas. On November 4, 2019, Penske acquired the Indianapolis Motor Speedway, a 2.5-mile course in Speedway, Indiana, the Indianapolis 500-mile race and IndyCar from the Hulman Family for an undisclosed amount.

Awards and honors
Auto racing
Six-time NASCAR Xfinity Series Champion as owner (2010, 2013, 2014, 2015, 2017, 2020, 2021)
Five-time IndyCar Series Champion as owner (2006, 2014, 2016, 2017, 2019)
Three-time NASCAR Cup Series Champion as owner (2012, 2018, 2022)
18-time Indianapolis 500 winner as owner (1972, 1979, 1981, 1984, 1985, 1987, 1988, 1991, 1993, 1994, 2001, 2002, 2003, 2006, 2009, 2015, 2018, 2019)
Three-time Daytona 500 winner as owner (2008, 2015, 2022)
1990 Golden Plate Award of the American Academy of Achievement
2018 Simeone Foundation Spirit of Competition Award recipient

Halls of Fame
1995 Motorsports Hall of Fame of America inductee
1998 International Motorsports Hall of Fame inductee
2002 Indianapolis Motor Speedway Hall of Fame inductee
2015 Automotive Hall of Fame inductee at a Renaissance Center gala in the City of Detroit, Michigan.
2016 Sports Car Club of America (SCCA) Hall of Fame Inductee
2019 NASCAR Hall of Fame inductee

National
2019 Presidential Medal of Freedom recipient

Local
Street renamed Roger Penske Drive in Santa Ana, California

Motorsports career results

SCCA National Championship Runoffs

Complete Formula One World Championship results

24 Hours of Le Mans results

Bibliography
Roger Penske - Sports Car Club of America

References

External links
 Penske Corporation
 Penske Racing
 
 

Living people
1937 births
 
24 Hours of Le Mans drivers
People from Shaker Heights, Ohio
Racing drivers from Ohio
American automobile salespeople
American billionaires
American Formula One drivers
Auto racing crew chiefs
Culver Academies alumni
Formula One team owners
Formula One team principals
IndyCar Series team owners
NASCAR team owners
Lehigh University alumni
General Electric people
Michigan Republicans
Ohio Republicans
International Motorsports Hall of Fame inductees
World Sportscar Championship drivers
Sportspeople from Cuyahoga County, Ohio
SCCA National Championship Runoffs winners
Presidential Medal of Freedom recipients
American Magic
NASCAR Hall of Fame inductees
Team Penske